This is a list of the National Register of Historic Places listings in Bowie County, Texas.

This is intended to be a complete list of properties and districts listed on the National Register of Historic Places in Bowie County, Texas. There are one district and 17 individual properties listed on the National Register in the county. Seven individually listed properties are Recorded Texas Historic Landmarks including one that is also a State Antiquities Landmark. An additional property is also part of a State Antiquities Landmark.

Current listings

The publicly disclosed locations of National Register properties and districts may be seen in a mapping service provided.

|}

See also

National Register of Historic Places listings in Texas
Recorded Texas Historic Landmarks in Bowie County

References

External links

Registered Historic Places
Bowie County
Buildings and structures in Bowie County, Texas